Ajanew Bayene (born 11 November 1936) is an Ethiopian sprinter. He competed in the men's 400 metres at the 1956 Summer Olympics.

References

1936 births
Living people
Athletes (track and field) at the 1956 Summer Olympics
Ethiopian male sprinters
Ethiopian male middle-distance runners
Olympic athletes of Ethiopia
Place of birth missing (living people)